Diospyros puncticulosa is a tree in the family Ebenaceae. The twigs dry to black. The specific epithet  is from the Latin meaning "minutely dotted", referring to the fruits. Habitat is lowland mixed dipterocarp forests from sea-level to  altitude. D. puncticulosa is endemic to Borneo.

References

puncticulosa
Plants described in 1933
Endemic flora of Borneo
Trees of Borneo